Pharus may refer to:

 Pharus (bivalve), a genus of bivalves in the family Pharidae
 Pharus (plant), a genus of grasses
 Pharos, Greek name for lighthouses, used for:
 Pharos of Alexandria
 Pharus (colony), Greek colony on the Adriatic island of Hvar